Hans Schultheiss (11 June 1921 – 23 February 2013) was a Swiss rower who competed in the 1948 Summer Olympics. He died in February 2013 at the age of 91.

References

1921 births
2013 deaths
Olympic rowers of Switzerland
Rowers at the 1948 Summer Olympics
Swiss male rowers